This is a list of notable people associated with the Vrije Universiteit Brussel, including rectors, faculty, current and former scientists, and alumni.

Rectors

Alumni

Scientists and academics 
 Diederik Aerts (1953-)
 Leo Apostel (1925-1995)
 Patrick Baert (1961-)
 Jean Bourgain (1954-2018)
 Ingrid Daubechies (1954-)
 Sophie de Schaepdrijver (1961-)
 Willy Gepts (1922-1991)
 Raymond Hamers
 Francis Heylighen (1960-)
 Pattie Maes
 Christine Van Den Wyngaert (1952-)
 Lode Wyns

Artists 
 André Delvaux (1926-2002)
 Fabienne Demal (Axelle Red) (1968-)
 Jef Geeraerts (1930-)
 Erik Pevernagie (1939-)

Politicians 
 Bert Anciaux (1959-)
 Karel De Gucht (1954-)
 Patrick Dewael (1955-)
 Christian Leysen (1954-)
 Annemie Neyts (1944-)
 Bruno Tobback (1969-)
 Louis Tobback (1938-)
 Johan Vande Lanotte (1955-)
 Frank Vanhecke (1959-)
 Willy Claes (1938- )
 Upakit Pachariyangkun (1961-)

Businesspeople 
 Tony Mary (1950-)
 François Narmon

Athletes 
 Sébastien Godefroid (1971-), Olympic sailor

Vrije Universiteit Brussel
Vrije Universiteit Brussel